Unsolved may refer to:

Unsolved (album), a 2000 album by the American band Karate
Unsolved (UK TV programme), a 2004–2006 British crime documentary television programme that aired on STV in Scotland
Unsolved (South Korean TV series), a 2010 South Korean television series
Unsolved (U.S. TV series), a 2018 American television series
Unsolved: The Boy Who Disappeared, a 2016 online series by BBC Three
The Unsolved, a 1997 Japanese video game
BuzzFeed Unsolved, a show by BuzzFeed discussing unsolved crimes and haunted places

See also  
Solved (disambiguation)
Unsolved Mysteries, an American true crime television program that debuted in 1987